Ville-Vesa Vainiola (born April 2, 1985) is a Finnish professional ice hockey player who played with Lukko in the SM-liiga for three seasons from 2005–06 to 2007–08.

References

External links

1985 births
Finnish ice hockey centres
Living people
Lukko players
People from Rauma, Finland
Sportspeople from Satakunta